Eudonia xysmatias is a moth in the family Crambidae. It was first described by Edward Meyrick in 1907. This species is endemic to New Zealand and has been observed and collected in Otago. This species inhabits wetlands. Adults are day flying and are on the wing in December and January.

Taxonomy 
This species was first described by Edward Meyrick and named Scoparia xysmatias. In 1928 George Hudson described and illustrated this species under that name. In 1988 John S. Dugdale placed this species in the genus Eudonia. The male holotype, collected by J. H. Lewis in the Old Man Range in Central Otago, is held at the Natural History Museum, London.

Description 

Meyrick described this species as follows:

Distribution

This species is endemic to New Zealand.

Habitat 
This moth inhabits various wetlands.

Behaviour 
E. xysmatias is a day flying moth. Adults are on the wing in December and January.

References

Moths described in 1907
Eudonia
Endemic fauna of New Zealand
Moths of New Zealand
Taxa named by Edward Meyrick
Endemic moths of New Zealand